Flux Outside is the third studio album by rock band Royal Bangs. The album was released on March 29, 2011.

Track listing

References

2011 albums
Royal Bangs albums
Glassnote Records albums